German submarine U-868 was a Type IXC/40 U-boat of Nazi Germany's Kriegsmarine in the Second World War. The ship was ordered on 25 August 1941 and laid down on 11 March 1943. She was launched on 18 August 1943, at Bremen, Germany. She had two commanders over her operational lifespan, for the period from 23 December 1943 until 21 July 1944 it was Kapitänleutnant Dietrich Rauch, then Oberleutnant zur See Eduard Turre for the period from 22 July 1944 until 9 May 1945.

Design
German Type IXC/40 submarines were slightly larger than the original Type IXCs. U-868 had a displacement of  when at the surface and  while submerged. She had two shafts and two  propellers.

U-868 was fitted with six  torpedo tubes (four fitted at the bow and two at the stern), 22 torpedoes, one  SK C/32 naval gun, 180 rounds, and a  Flak M42 as well as two twin  C/30 anti-aircraft guns. The boat had a complement of forty-eight.

Service history
In her operations, she sank a single warship, the 672 tons  on 17 March 1945.

Fate
U-868 was surrendered by her captain on 9 May 1945 at Bergen in Norway. She was then transferred to Loch Ryan 30 May 1945 for Operation Deadlight, where a large number of U-boats were sunk in one operation. U-868 was sunk on 30 November 1945 during operation.

Summary of raiding history

References

Notes

Citations

Bibliography

External links

World War II submarines of Germany
1943 ships
U-boats commissioned in 1943
U-boats scuttled in 1945
Ships built in Bremen (state)
Operation Deadlight
Maritime incidents in November 1945
German Type IX submarines